Virasat may refer to:

 Virasat (1997 film), a 1997 Bollywood film starring Anil Kapoor, Tabu and Pooja Batra
 Virasat (Urdu film), a Pakistani Urdu-language film
 Viraasat (STAR One), a drama-series appeared on the Indian satellite television network STAR One
 Virasaat (Sahara One), a Hindi language serial aired on the Indian satellite television network Sahara One
 Virasat (festival), a cultural festival organized by SPIC MACAY